Sisyrinchium septentrionale, the northern blue-eyed grass, is a plant species native to western North America. It has been known from Canada (British Columbia, Alberta, Saskatchewan, and Northwest Territories), and 4 counties in the US State of Washington (Okanagan, Ferry, Stevens and Pend Oreille) and 2 in Montana (Sheridan and Richland).

Sisyrinchium septentrionale is a perennial herb up to 50 cm tall. Flowers are pale blue to light violet-blue, with yellow bases.

References

septentrionale
Flora of Washington (state)
Flora of British Columbia
Flora of the Northwest Territories
Flora of Alberta
Flora of Saskatchewan
Plants described in 1899
Flora without expected TNC conservation status